Portland-Columbia Bridge may refer to:
Portland-Columbia Toll Bridge
Portland-Columbia Pedestrian Bridge